Eburodacrys vittata is a species of beetle in the family Cerambycidae. It was described by Blanchard in 1847.

References

Eburodacrys
Beetles described in 1847